Divriği station is a railway station in Divriği, Turkey. Located in the eastern Sivas Province, and in the northeast of the town, TCDD Taşımacılık operates a daily intercity train, the Eastern Express, from Ankara (temporarily Irmak) to Kars, a daily regional train to Erzincan and a thrice daily regional train to Sivas. Divriği station was opened on 11 December 1938 by the Turkish State Railways.

References

External links
Divriği station information
Divriği station timetable

Railway stations opened in 1938
Railway stations in Sivas Province
1938 establishments in Turkey
Divriği District